Solomon "Saba" Kvirkvelia (born 6 February 1992) is a Georgian professional footballer who plays as a centre-back for Neftçi PFK and the Georgia national team.

Club career

Rubin Kazan
After spending a season with Zenit Saint Petersburg, Kvirkvelia joined another Russian club, FC Rubin Kazan in 2011. He made his Russian Premier League debut for FC Rubin Kazan on 22 July 2011 in a game against FC Terek Grozny.

Lokomotiv Moscow
In February 2017, FC Rubin Kazan and Lokomotiv Moscow agreed a loan deal for Kvirkvelia until the end of the season. Kvirkvelia became a regular member of the team, participating 12 games until the end of the season. Lokomotiv won Russian Cup during this season, which was the first title for the Georgian with his new club.

On 30 June 2017, he moved to Lokomotiv on a permanent basis, signing a four-year contract.

Loan to Rotor Volgograd
On 20 August 2020, he joined Rotor Volgograd on loan for the 2020–21 season.

Gagra
On 8 April 2022, Kvirkvelia returned to Georgia and signed with Gagra.

Neftçi
On 4 July 2022, Neftçi announced the signing of Kvirkvelia on a two-year contract.

International career
On an international level, he debuted for Georgia in a friendly match against Liechtenstein on 5 March 2014.

Honours
Rubin Kazan
Russian Cup: 2011–12

Lokomotiv Moscow
Russian Premier League: 2017–18
Russian Cup: 2016–17, 2018–19
Individual
Georgian Footballer of the Year: 2014, 2017

Career statistics

Club

1.Includes Russian Super Cup.

International

References

External links
 
 
 UEFA Profile

1992 births
Living people
Association football central defenders
Footballers from Georgia (country)
Georgia (country) international footballers
Georgia (country) youth international footballers
Georgia (country) under-21 international footballers
Russian Premier League players
Ukrainian Premier League players
FC Rubin Kazan players
Expatriate footballers from Georgia (country)
Expatriate footballers in Russia
Expatriate sportspeople from Georgia (country) in Russia
Expatriate footballers in Ukraine
Expatriate sportspeople from Georgia (country) in Ukraine
FC Lokomotiv Moscow players
FC Zenit Saint Petersburg players
FC Neftekhimik Nizhnekamsk players
FC Rotor Volgograd players
FC Metalist 1925 Kharkiv players
FC Gagra players
People from Samtredia